The 1960–61 1re série season was the 40th season of the 1re série, the top level of ice hockey in France. Chamonix Hockey Club won their 18th league title.

First round

Paris Group
Athletic Club de Boulogne-Billancourt qualified for the final.

Alpes Group

Final
 Chamonix Hockey Club - Athletic Club de Boulogne-Billancourt 6:3/3:1

External links
Season on hockeyarchives.info

Fra
1960–61 in French ice hockey
Ligue Magnus seasons